California's 10th congressional district is a congressional district in the U.S. state of California. Currently, the 10th district encompasses parts of the eastern San Francisco Bay Area. It is currently represented by Democrat Mark DeSaulnier.

The district previously included all of Stanislaus County and part of San Joaquin County. It was centered on Modesto. Cities in the district included Oakdale, Manteca, Modesto, Tracy, and Turlock.

Redistricting before the 2022 elections moved the district to the San Francisco Bay Area. It includes the cities of Concord, Walnut Creek, Danville, San Ramon, Brentwood, and southern Antioch in Contra Costa County, and eastern Dublin in Alameda County. It was essentially the successor of the old 11th district.

History

Until 2012 
Prior to redistricting by the California Citizens Redistricting Commission going into effect in 2012, the 10th district stretched from Livermore to Dixon and the outskirts of Vacaville. It consisted of portions of Alameda, Contra Costa, Sacramento, and Solano Counties.Following redistricting in 1992, the 10th district was based in the East Bay, and included parts of Alameda and Contra Costa counties. It received national attention in 1996 when Democrat Ellen Tauscher defeated incumbent Republican Bill Baker in what was considered an upset.

In the 2002 redistricting of California, all seats were made safe for the parties of incumbent officeholders. The district boundaries were extended to include parts of Solano County, southwestern Sacramento County, eastern Contra Costa County and El Cerrito in western Contra Costa County. Although much of the suburban Tri-Valley region was shifted to the 11th congressional district, the city of Livermore remained in the 10th at Tauscher's request (as a member of the U.S. House Committee on Energy and Commerce, she had some oversight responsibilities over the U.S. Department of Energy, and hence indirectly of Lawrence Livermore National Laboratory).

On June 26, 2009, Tauscher resigned her seat to be sworn in as Undersecretary of State for Arms Control and International Security. In the ensuing special election held on November 3, 2009, former Democratic Lieutenant Governor John Garamendi won the seat over Republican David Harmer 53.0% to 42.7%. Immediately following redistricting, Garamendi successfully ran for re-election in California's 3rd congressional district, which shares many municipalities with the 2002 version of the 10th district (e.g. Vacaville and Fairfield), but lies significantly northwest of the current 10th district.

2012 – 2022 
The 10th congressional district starting with the election of 2012 and lasting through the election of 2020 included all of Stanislaus County (including Ceres, Oakdale, Modesto, Riverbank, and Turlock) and the southern portion of San Joaquin County (including Tracy and Manteca).

This went into effect in 2012, as the result of redistricting by the California Citizens Redistricting Commission. This version of the 10th included much of the core of the old 18th district (Modesto, Ceres, and the southwestern half of Stanislaus County), though the 18th also included a substantial portion of Stockton. It also shares much of the northwestern portion of the old 19th district (Turlock, Riverbank, Oakdale, and the rest of northeastern Stanislaus County).

Republican Jeff Denham transferred from the prior 19th district to the newer 10th. He held it for three terms until being defeated in 2018 by Democrat Josh Harder, who won reelection in 2020.

After 2022 
The 10th district was redrawn in time for the 2022 election, being divided up between California's 5th congressional district (which now includes eastern portions of Modesto and eastern portions of Turlock), California's 9th congressional district (which is centered on Stockton, California and includes Tracy), and California's 13th congressional district (which includes western Modesto and western Turlock) .  Current 10th district incumbent Josh Harder is running for reelection in the new version of California's 9th congressional district.

Election results from statewide races

1992 – 2022

Competitiveness

Voter Registration Statistics

The California Secretary of State publishes reports on California voter registration on a regular basis. Before the 2018 primary election, they published a report dating May 21, 2018.

Composition

As of the 2020 redistricting, California's 10th congressional district encompasses most of Contra Costa County, and part of Alameda County.

Contra Costa County is split between this district, the 8th district, and the 9th district. The northern border is partitioned by Grizzly Peak Blvd, Seaview Trail, Camino Pablo, Bear Creek Rd, San Pablo Creek, Bear Creek, Brianes Reservoir, Burlington Northern Santa Fe, Highway 4, Alhambra Ave, Pacheco Blvd, Grandview Ave, Central Ave, Imhoff Dr, Bares Ave, Mount Diablo Creek, Union Pacific, Contra Costa Canal, 4WD Rd, Bailey Rd, James Donlon Blvd, Cambridge Dr, Reseda Way, S Royal links Cir, Carpinteria Dr, Barmouth Dr, Hillcrest Ave, Highway 4, and Highway 160. The western border is partitioned by Old River, Italian Slough, Western Farms Ranch Rd, Rankin Rd, Highway J14, Byron Hot Springs Rd, Camino Diablo, Kellogg Creek, Sellers Ave, Brentwood Blvd, Alloro Dr, Ghiggeri Dr, Emilio Dr, Guthrie Ln, Balfour Rd, Chestnut St, Byron Highway, Orwood Rd, Burlington Northern Santa Fe, Werner Dredger Cut, and Rock Slough. The 10th district takes in the south sides of the cities of Antioch and Martinez, the cities of Concord, Brentwood, Oakley, Pleasant Hill, Clayton, Walnut Creek, Lafayette, Orinda, and San Ramon, as well as the towns of Danville and Moraga.

Alameda County is split between this district and the 14th district. They are partitioned by Sinclair Freeway, Amador Valley Blvd, Emerald Ave, Tamarack Dr, Brighton Dr, Ione Way, Newcastle Ln, Dougherty Rd, Highway 580, Lembert Hills Dr. The 10th district takes in San Ramon Village and Komandorski Village.

Cities & CDP with 10,000 or more people
 Concord - 129,295
 Antioch - 115,291
 San Ramon - 84,605
 Walnut Creek - 70,127
 Brentwood - 64,292
 Danville - 43,582
 Oakley - 43,357
 Martinez - 38,290
 Pleasant Hill - 34,613
 Lafayette - 25,391
 Orinda - 19,514 
 Moraga - 16,870
 Clayton - 11,070

List of members representing the district

Election results for representatives

1912

1914

1916 (Special)

1916

1918

1920

1922

1923 (Special)
Republican John D. Fredericks won the special election to replace fellow Republican Henry Z. Osborne, who died in office.

1924

1926

1928

1930

1932

1934

1936

1937 (Special)
Democrat Alfred J. Elliott won the special election to replace fellow Democrat Henry E. Stubbs, who died in office.

1938

1940

1942

1944

1946

1948

1950

1952

1954

1956

1958

1960

1962

1964

1966

1968

1970

1972

1974

1976

1978

1980

1982

1984

1986

1988

1990

1992

1994

1996

1998

2000

2002

2004

2006

2008

2009 (Special)

2010

2012

2014

2016

2018

2020

See also
 List of United States congressional districts

References

External links
 GovTrack.us: California's 10th congressional district
 RAND California Election Returns: District Definitions (out of date)
 California Voter Foundation map - CD10 (out of date)

10
Government of San Joaquin County, California
Government of Stanislaus County, California
San Joaquin Valley
Ceres, California
Modesto, California
Oakdale, California
Tracy, California
Turlock, California
Constituencies established in 1913
1913 establishments in California